Sentinel Rock State Park is a  state park in Westmore, Vermont. It is open for hiking, educational pursuits, hunting, and trapping.

The park is mostly undeveloped, and features a parking area, interpretative signage and ADA accessible trails that lead visitors to Sentinel Rock and to the former site of a farmhouse.

The land was previously a farm and was donated to the state in 1997 by its owner, Windsor Wright. Portions of the park continue to be managed as sustainable agricultural and forest land.

References

External links
 Sentinel Rock State Park

State parks of Vermont
Protected areas of Orleans County, Vermont
Westmore, Vermont
2015 establishments in Vermont